Tomáš Berdych was the defending champion, but lost in the second round to Robin Söderling.

Roger Federer won in the final 6–3, 6–4, against Philipp Kohlschreiber. He did not lose a single set in the entire tournament.

Seeds

Draw

Finals

Top half

Bottom half

External links
Singles draw
Qualifying draw

Singles